Kodumon (pronounced ko-du-mann)  is a village in Adoor Taluk of  Pathanamthitta district in the state of Kerala, India.

Temples
Chilanthi Temple - Kodumon is famous for the Chilanthi temple situated 1.5 km east of Kodumon junction. The temple is dedicated to the Goddess (Palliara Devi). People from all over Kerala and India throng this place to seek help for treatment of spider poisoning and related insect bites.

Kodumon Vaikundapuram temple is one of the important temples in Kodumon village.  The temple is dedicated to Lord Vishnu. Puthankavil Devi Temple, choorakkunnil malanada temple are other important temples.

Demographics
 India census, Kodumon had a population of 15114 with 7159 males and 7955 females.

References

Villages in Pathanamthitta district